The women's 200 metre breaststroke event at the 2018 Commonwealth Games was held on 7 April at the Gold Coast Aquatic Centre.

Records
Prior to this competition, the existing world, Commonwealth and Games records were as follows:

Results

Heats
The heats were held at 10:40.

Final
The final was held at 21:09.

References

Women's 200 metre breaststroke
Commonwealth Games
Common